Sylhet Metropolitan Police or SMP was formed in 2009 to serve the city of Sylhet in north-eastern Bangladesh. It is the largest metropolitan police unit by area in Bangladesh.

History 
Sylhet Metropolitan Police started operations on 26 October 2006 with only two police stations, Kotwali Police Station and Dakshin Surma Police Station.

Sylhet Metropolitan Police was regularized through the passage of the Sylhet Metropolitan Police Act, 2009. Plans were announced to expand the metropolitan police station through the addition of four police stations in April 2009. The commissioner, Syed Toufique Uddin Ahmed, was based in a small shed of Bangladesh Water Development Board and the police personnel were garrisoned in Sylhet Range Reserve Force due to lack of adequate accommodations.

A Sylhet court ordered Sylhet Metropolitan Police to investigate five officers of the Detective Branch over the custodial death of Abdul Khalique in March 2013.

In September 2014, Quamrul Ahsan, the deputy inspector general of Railway Police Dhaka Range, was made the Sylhet Metropolitan Police Commissioner.

Sylhet Metropolitan Police suspended four police officers over the death of Rayhan Ahmed in custody at Bandarbazar Police Outpost following protests. His wife filed a case over the death on 11 October 2020 with Kotwali Police Station. Suspended sub-inspector Akbar Hossain Bhuiyan tried to flee to India but was detained by the Khasi people in Meghalaya and handed over to a Bangladeshi national at the border who returned him to Bangladesh Police custody. A video of his detention by Khasi people went viral on Bangladeshi social media. Five officers were charged in Sylhet Court on 18 April 2022 over the death of Rayhan Ahmed in custody. On 20 October 2020, Sylhet Metropolitan Police Commissioner Golam Kibria and 18 other police officers were transferred out of Sylhet Metropolitan Police.

In November, jewelers attacked journalists and damaged a camera of NTV during a raid of Sylhet Metropolitan Police at a gold jewelry store in Haque Super Market after gold was stolen from journalist Ashraful Kabir house in Sylhet. On 2 December 2022, three police constables of Sylhet Metropolitan Police were suspended after an investigation by the Sylhet Metropolitan Police found them involved in planting drugs two students including one whose father was a police Inspector, Abu Sayed.

Stations
Sylhet Metropolitan Police has 6 police stations.
Kotwali Model Thana, Sylhet
Jalalabad Thana
Airport Thana, Sylhet
Moglabazar Thana
South Surma Thana
Shah Poran (R.) Thana
Gulapgonj Model Thana

References

Organisations based in Sylhet
Municipal law enforcement agencies of Bangladesh